Computation of Incompressible and Compressible flow generally depends on the Mach Number M, where for a range of zero to supersonic compressible equations are applied but with a possible error on a range of M<0.2 . For this range we have to apply Incompressible Navier Stokes and Euler equations but the work would be much easier if we find a Unified Method for solving both the flows.
Unified method can also lead us towards much more accuracy and efficiency.

Why the standard method for solving Compressible flows fails?

The basic cause of failure for the Compressible Flow methods is the stiffness of the governing Equations.

Conservation of mass

Conservation of momentum

Conservation of energy 

One way to fix this problem is to change the governing equation; known as Preconditioning; which can also increases the accuracy.

The other cause for the break down is Pressure because it is not taken into account as primary unknown. 
For making the governing equation workable for both the Compressible and Incompressible flows, following things needs to be corrected:-

•	Usage of Dimensionless Pressure thereby removing the difficulties faced while solving for very low Mach Number

•	Use non Conservative form of energy which increases the efficiency.

•	Discretization of the mass conservation equation
 
•	Use MUSCL and Runge Kutta time stepping

Governing equation

Conservation of mass

Equation of state

Momentum equation 

By using the dimensionless pressure and equation of state the governing equation can be best described as :

Finite volume scheme 
For the above specified governing equations the finite volume scheme is

where 

Here

with c as the speed of the sound.

And it is found that here m and p are the terms evaluated at new  time level t^(n+1)
This is mostly based on the 1 dimension case

Pressure correction method 

For a higher order nonlinear system we have to use iterative methods. So for the better results we use the pressure correction method 
In this method first t^(n+1)is obtained. Next a momentum prediction m* by replacing p^(n+1/2) by p^n

A momentum correctionis postulated as

Substitution of   gives the following Pressure
Correction Equation for

Boundary conditions 
Boundary conditions needed for solving above methods 
for j=1

For j=J the momentum equation is integrated over a half cell:

Runge Kutta method 

There are other methods too for finding the more accurate, more efficient results like one is runge kutta method.  it is known as a time stepping method in which one can freeze the time of first three steps and jump to the fourth level  of the Euler equation with full time T so (m+1)  stage becomes:

In the fourth stage pressure Correction is carried out:

References

Computational fluid dynamics